Barefoot (the acoustic ep) is the first EP by recording artist Ron "Bumblefoot" Thal, released in December 2008. Barefoot is the first collection of acoustic recordings by Thal. The CD contains re-interpretations of his own songs, in both instrumental and vocal versions, in an acoustic style.

Track listing

References

Ron "Bumblefoot" Thal albums
2008 albums